Grant is a city in Newaygo County in the U.S. state of Michigan.  The population was 952 at the 2020 census. The city is adjacent to Grant Township and Ashland Township. It is a part of the Grand Rapids-Muskegon-Holland, Michigan combined statistical area.

History 

The history of Grant started in 1882 when Andrew J. Squier built the first saw mill. Soon, a railroad station was built on the Chicago and Western Michigan Railroad. Squier named the station, Grant Station, after President and Civil War General Ulysses S. Grant. The community was also called Grant Center due to its location in the township.

On May 14, 1892, a post office was opened here as Grant Station. Grant Center was incorporated in 1893 as the village of Grant. The post office name was shortened to Grant in 1899.

At the sawmills' peak production in the lumber-era, a million feet of lumber was shipped per year. The village of Grant was reincorporated as a city in 1969.

Geography

Demographics

2010 census
As of the census of 2010, there were 894 people, 361 households, and 229 families living in the city. The racial makeup of the city was 93.8% White, 0.1% African American, 0.4% Native American, 0.3% Asian, 4.5% from other races, and 0.8% from two or more races. Hispanic or Latino of any race were 13.3% of the population.

There were 361 households, of which 37.7% had children under the age of 18 living with them, 41.0% were married couples living together, 17.2% had a female householder with no husband present, 5.3% had a male householder with no wife present, and 36.6% were non-families. 31.9% of all households were made up of individuals, and 18.5% had someone living alone who was 65 years of age or older. The average household size was 2.46, and the average family size was 3.06.

The median age in the city was 31.9 years. 29.5% of residents were under the age of 18; 9.2% were between the ages of 18 and 24; 24.8% were from 25 to 44; 20.9% were from 45 to 64; and 15.7% were 65 years of age or older. The gender makeup of the city was 46.2% male and 53.8% female.

2000 census
As of the census of 2000, there were 881 people, 323 households, and 214 families living in the city. The racial makeup of the city was 95.12% White, 0.23% African American, 0.23% Native American, 0.11% Asian, 2.04% from other races, and 2.27% from two or more races. Hispanic or Latino of any race were 10.33% of the population.

There were 323 households, out of which 37.5% had children under the age of 18 living with them, 48.0% were married couples living together, 14.6% had a female householder with no husband present, and 33.7% were non-families. 29.1% of all households were made up of individuals, and 19.2% had someone living alone who was 65 years of age or older.  The average household size was 2.59, and the average family size was 3.22.

In the city, the population was spread out, with 29.6% under the age of 18, 11.2% from 18 to 24, 24.6% from 25 to 44, 16.2% from 45 to 64, and 18.3% who were 65 years of age or older.  The median age was 32 years. For every 100 females, there were 86.3 males.  For every 100 females age 18 and over, there were 76.1 males.

The median income for a household in the city was $50,972, and the median income for a family was $44,583. Males had a median income of $41,250 versus $26,696 for females. The per capita income for the city was $15,308.  About 11.1% of families and 20.8% of the population were below the poverty line, including 26.1% of those under age 18 and 19.9% of those age 65 or over.

Government
The city is served by Grant Public School District and the Grant Area District Library.

Historical Sites
Grant Depot and Water Tower

Major highways

References

External links

Grant Area District Library

Cities in Newaygo County, Michigan
Grand Rapids metropolitan area
Populated places established in 1882